Phyllomacromia pseudafricana is a species of dragonfly in the family Corduliidae. It is found in Benin, Ivory Coast, Ghana, Nigeria, and Uganda. Its natural habitats are subtropical or tropical moist lowland forests and rivers.

References

Corduliidae
Taxonomy articles created by Polbot